A remote camera, also known as a trail camera or game camera, is a camera placed by a photographer in areas where the photographer generally cannot be at the camera to snap the shutter. This includes areas with limited access, tight spaces where a person is not allowed, or just another angle so that the photographer can simultaneously take pictures of the same moment from different locations. 

Remote cameras are most widely used in sports photography. 35 mm digital or film, and medium format cameras are the most common types of cameras that are used.

Uses and practices 

Remote cameras are used by photographers to take more pictures from different angles. Remotes are very popular in sports and wildlife photography. 

Cameras are often placed in angles that a photographer cannot physically be during a shoot. Sport use examples include behind the backboard at a basketball game or overhead in the rafters of an arena during a hockey game.

Placement 

Remote cameras placed in suspended positions usually are mounted with clamps and arms such as the Bogen Super Clamp and Variable Friction Arm, often referred to as "Magic Arms". The camera and lens are connected to the variable friction arm which is attached to the Super Clamp which in turn is secured to a fixed item such as a basketball post, hand railing, or rafter. Ground plates or tripods are typically used for remote cameras placed on the ground.

Triggering 

Remote cameras can be fired via hand triggers, sound triggers, proximity sensation, radio transmitters (mainly Bluetooth shutters), or the self-timer built into the camera. 

For remotes that are in close proximity to the photographer, hand or sound triggers can be used.

A hand trigger consists of a button or switch that is connected to the camera via a wire that is set to fire the camera's shutter.

For remotes that are placed away from the photographer, radio triggering systems such as the Bluetooth shutter button, Pocket Wizards or Flash Wizards are used. A radio trigger consists of a button or switch that is connected to a radio triggering transmitter or transceiver which is set to fire a radio triggering receiver or transceiver that is connected to the camera via a wire that is set to fire the camera's shutter.

For rocket launches, including the Space Shuttle, remote cameras are triggered by the sound of the launch.

Game camera 

A game camera is a rugged and weatherproof camera designed for extended and unsupervised use outdoors. The images they produce, taken automatically when motion is sensed, are used for game surveillance by hunters, farmers, ranchers, and wildlife professionals.  

The most of hunters record videos of their hunting trips using trail cameras or game cameras. These cameras are intended to be put on trees or other objects, and they are motion-activated. This motion sensor enables the camera to capture images or videos of animals without using up all of its storage space. 

They are also used by people endeavouring to take photographs of the non-existent creature Bigfoot. 

They can also be helpful for animal loss/rescue in documenting the presence and species of animals, such as determining whether a runaway dog is returning to its home at night or verifying the species actually eating the food left for a stray/feral cat.

See also 
 Camera trap
 Digital camera
 Film format
 Infrared photography
 Movie camera
 Selfie stick
 Video camera

References 

Cameras
Photography equipment
Optical devices